Miss USA is an American beauty pageant that has been held annually since 1952 to select the entrant from United States in the Miss Universe pageant.

Titleholders 
Nine Miss USA winners have gone on to become Miss Universe and are indicated in bold face. Since 1965, a runner-up has been selected to replace any Miss USA titleholder who wins the Miss Universe pageant.

Key

Gallery

Winners by state

The state later won the Miss Universe title indicated in bold
The state later inherited the Miss USA title after the original titleholder crowned Miss Universe indicated in italics

Debut wins
Not including states who were inherited the title.

States have yet to win Miss USA
There have been no Miss USA winners from the following states: 

  Alaska
  Colorado
  Delaware
  Georgia
  Indiana
  Maine
  Montana
  New Hampshire
  New Jersey
  North Dakota
  Oregon
  South Dakota
  West Virginia
  Wisconsin
  Wyoming

Notes

References

External links

Miss USA official website

Miss USA titleholders
Miss USA titleholders
Miss USA titleholders